Thomas Jesse Fears (December 3, 1922 – January 4, 2000) was a Mexican-American professional football player who was a split end for the Los Angeles Rams in the National Football League (NFL), playing nine seasons from 1948 to 1956. He was later an NFL assistant coach and head coach of the New Orleans Saints, and is in the Pro Football Hall of Fame. He played college football for the UCLA Bruins football team and is a member of the College Football Hall of Fame.

Early life
Born in Guadalajara, Mexico, Fears was the son of a Mexican mother, Carmen Valdés, and an American father, mining engineer Charles William Fears. The family moved to Los Angeles when Tom was age six. There, he began to display his ample work ethic by unloading flowers for 25 cents an hour, and later serving as an usher at football games for double that amount.

Fears first played football at Los Angeles' Manual Arts High School, where he met Toby Freedman of Beverly Hills High School. They became longtime friends.  Upon graduation, he enrolled at Santa Clara University.  He spent one year at the school before being drafted in World War II and spent the next three years in military service.  After his father became a Japanese prisoner of war, Fears sought to become a fighter pilot to fight Japan.  He became a pilot, but was instead shipped to Colorado Springs to play football for a service team.

Upon his release, he had been drafted by the Rams in 1945, but remained in school and transferred to UCLA, winning All-American honors each of his two seasons at the school.  His senior campaign nearly ended in an abrupt fashion in 1947, when he and some Bruin teammates were investigated for posing in local advertisements for a Los Angeles clothing store.  When it was determined that Fears and the other players worked for the store, and were not identified as athletes, the matter was dropped.

This job had been one of many provided by school boosters, and included a brief bit as a pilot in the Humphrey Bogart film Action in the North Atlantic.  The largesse by such people led Fears to joke that his $6,000 first-year contract and $500 bonus from the Rams meant that he was taking a pay cut.

Playing career

Los Angeles Rams
Selected as a defensive back by the Los Angeles Rams in the eleventh round (103rd overall) of the 1945 NFL Draft, he is distinguished as being the first Mexican-born player to be drafted into the National Football League. Fears quickly made his mark as a wide receiver in 1948, while also displaying his versatility by playing on defense and at split end. During his first three seasons at the professional level, he led all NFL receivers in catches, and broke the league's single-season record with 77 catches in 1949.

The record would be short-lived as he increased that mark to 84 during the 1950 NFL season, including a then-record 18 catches in one game against the Green Bay Packers on November 12. He also helped the team advance to the NFL title game with a trio of touchdown receptions in the divisional playoff against the Chicago Bears, winning All-Pro accolades for the second consecutive year.

During the ensuing offseason, Fears became embroiled in a contract dispute with the team for the second straight year.  The year before, he hinted at leaving the team to work for General Motors Corporation, then announced on March 13, 1951, that he was retiring to work for a local liquor distributor.  Neither threat materialized, and despite offers from four Canadian Football League teams, Fears signed for $13,000.

That season, Fears played in only seven games, but helped lead the Rams to their third straight championship game appearance.  After two disappointments, the franchise captured its first NFL title since moving to the West Coast, with Fears an integral part of the title game victory when he caught the winning score.  His 73-yard touchdown reception midway through the fourth quarter broke a 17-17 deadlock with the Cleveland Browns.

After bouncing back in 1952 with 48 receptions for 600 yards and six scores, the beginning of the end of his career began after he fractured two vertebrae in an October 18, 1953 game against the Detroit Lions.  Limited to just 23 receptions that year, he would average 40 catches the next two years, but after a preseason injury in 1956, he hauled in only five passes and retired on November 6.  For the remainder of that campaign, he served as an assistant coach, finishing his playing days with 400 catches for 5,397 yards and 38 touchdowns.

Coaching career

Packers, Rams and Falcons
Fears was out of the game for the next two years, but returned briefly as an assistant in the first year of Vince Lombardi's reign with the Packers.  Business conflicts back in California caused him to leave the position at midseason, but Fears resumed his coaching career the following year with the Rams under former teammate Bob Waterfield.  After two seasons in that role, Fears returned to Green Bay for a four-year stint as an assistant, where he was part of championship teams in 1962 and 1965.

Fears applied for the head coaching job with the St. Louis Cardinals (football) after the 1965 NFL season, but after not being chosen, he joined fellow Packer assistant Norb Hecker, who had been named head coach of the expansion Atlanta Falcons.  In the first game of the 1966 regular season, Fears caused controversy when he accused Rams coach George Allen of attempting to garner inside information on the team from a player that had been cut, charges that were never proven.

New Orleans Saints
After that 2-12 first season in Atlanta, Fears became a head coach for the first time when he was hired by the expansion New Orleans Saints on January 27, 1967.  He was the first Latino head coach in the NFL. Despite the promise of the team scoring on the first-ever kickoff return in franchise history, Fears's nearly four years at the helm of what became a perennial losing franchise were an exercise in frustration.

In 1970, Fears was recognized for his professional playing career when he was elected to the Pro Football Hall of Fame. That March, rumors of Fears replacing the departed Don Shula with the Baltimore Colts surfaced, but Don McCafferty was hired by the Maryland team in early April.  Issues between Fears and Saints owner John W. Mecom Jr., primarily Fears seeking the additional role of general manager, fueled such speculation.  On April 20, the matter ended when he was given control over all player personnel matters, even though general manager Vic Schwenk remained in his role. 

Fears's tenure in his new dual roles, however, would be short, when the team ended the first half of the 1970 NFL season with a 1-5-1 mark, resulting in his dismissal on November 3 after compiling an overall mark of 13-34-2. His last game as coach of the Saints was a 30-17 loss to the team he played for, the Rams, the same team which defeated the Saints in their first game in 1967. J.D. Roberts was hired as Fears' successor, and in his first game, Tom Dempsey kicked an NFL-record 63-yard field goal to give the Saints a 19-17 victory over the Detroit Lions, New Orleans' only other win of 1970.

Eagles, WFL and USFL
He resurfaced in 1971, serving as offensive coordinator of the Philadelphia Eagles, but when head coach Ed Khayat (Fears' defensive line coach in New Orleans) was fired at the end of the 1972 NFL season, Fears was out of work again.

After spending 1973 off the gridiron, Fears was named head coach of the fledgling World Football League's Southern California Sun on January 14, 1974.  The fragile financial condition of the entire league resulted in Fears leading the team for less than two years before the WFL folded in October 1975.

Fears's disappointment was soothed somewhat when he was named to the College Football Hall of Fame in 1976, the same year he was named president of the All-Sports Council of Southern California, which helped amateur sports in the area.  One year later, he returned to coaching as an assistant at San Bernardino Junior College.

During this period, he was also working as a technical adviser for movies with a football connection, and in 1979, began a football scouting service.  The two roles came together in controversial fashion when Fears began working on the production of "North Dallas Forty", a film that took a look at the sordid side of the professional game.

Fears had three clients: the Packers, Houston Oilers and Pittsburgh Steelers, but after the movie was released, Fears saw all three teams drop his services.  Claiming that the NFL had blacklisted him, Fears spoke with league commissioner Pete Rozelle (who had worked for the Rams during Fears's playing days), but never again found work in the league.

Remaining on the fringes of the sport, Fears in 1980 worked as a coach for the Chapman College club football team, then became a part-owner of the Orange Empire Outlaws of the California Football League the following year.  In 1982, he was hired as player personnel director of the new United States Football League's Los Angeles Express.  Bolstered by huge spending from team owner William Daniels, the team reached the conference championship game, but saw financial troubles doom not only the team, but the league as well.

Fears's final position in football came in 1990, when he was named head coach of the Milan franchise in the fledgling International League of American Football.  Four years later, he was diagnosed with Alzheimer's disease, spending the final six years of his life battling the disease.

Fears was the first Mexico-born NFL player inducted into the Pro Football Hall of Fame.

References

 McDowell, Markus (2002). "Fears, Thomas Jesse ('Tom')." Scribner Encyclopedia of American Lives, Thematic Series: Sports Figures. Charles Scribner's Sons. Retrieved January 7, 2013 from HighBeam Research

External links

 
 

1922 births
2000 deaths
American football wide receivers
Mexican people of American descent
American sports announcers
Atlanta Falcons coaches
College Football Hall of Fame inductees
Green Bay Packers coaches
Los Angeles Rams coaches
Los Angeles Rams players
Mexican emigrants to the United States
Mexican players of American football
American sportspeople of Mexican descent
New Orleans Saints coaches
Sportspeople from Guadalajara, Jalisco
Sportspeople from Riverside County, California
People from Palm Desert, California
Military personnel from California
Philadelphia Eagles coaches
Pro Football Hall of Fame inductees
UCLA Bruins football players
Western Conference Pro Bowl players
Southern California Sun coaches
Players of American football from California
United States Army Air Forces pilots of World War II
San Bernardino Valley College alumni
Santa Clara University alumni
New Orleans Saints head coaches